Belly band, belly-band, or bellyband may refer to:

 Bellyband, a fairly loose strap passing outside the girth in a horse harness
 Bellyband, a compression garment used as maternity clothing
 Bellyband, a form of holster
 Bellyband, another name for an obi, a type of dust jacket that covers only a portion of a book
 Corset, in early modern slang
 Haramaki, a Japanese wrap used to preserve stomach qi
 Dudou, an unrelated Chinese garment used for a similar purpose

See also
Belly, an American rock band